Florence Pash Humphrey Holland (1862–1951) was a British portrait painter. She is known for running an art school with Walter Sickert in the mid-1890s.

Biography
Pash was born in London in 1862. She exhibited at the Royal Society of British Artists, the Paris Salon and the Royal Academy of Arts. Pash exhibited her work at the Palace of Fine Arts at the 1893 World's Columbian Exposition in Chicago, Illinois.

She ran a private art school in Sloane Street with the help of Walter Sickert.

She was a portraitist and was also the model for several notable artist including Sickert, Charles Conder, E. J. Sullivan, and Jacques-Émile Blanche.

She married Albert Alexander Humphrey in 1898 and was widowed in 1917. In 1923, she married C. T. Holland She signed her works Florence Pash, Mrs Florence P. Humphrey and  Mrs A. A. Humphrey.

Pash died on 25 June 1951.

References

1862 births
1951 deaths
19th-century English painters
20th-century English painters
19th-century English women artists
20th-century English women artists
Artists from London
British art teachers
English portrait painters
English women painters